The 2009 season was Gangwon FC's first ever season in the K-League in South Korea. Gangwon FC competed in K-League, League Cup and Korean FA Cup. In K-League, they won two consecutive games at first, but failed to win any of their following eight matches. They were eliminated from the League Cup as of May 5, 2009 after losing to Incheon United by 2-3. Gangwon won three games consecutively in the league by June 27. In Korean FA Cup 2009, however, they lost to Chunnam Dragons on 1 July.

Squad

 (captain)

K-League

Korean FA Cup

League Cup

Group stage

Squad statistics

Statistics

Statistics accurate as of match played 1 November 2009

Top scorers

Top assistors

Discipline

Transfer

In

Player in on loan

Out

References

 Gangwon FC website 

South Korean football clubs 2009 season
2009